Charlotta Maria Lönnqvist (4 February 1815 Siuntio – 27 April 1891 Siuntio) was a Finnish cultural personality. She is mainly known as the benefactor of Aleksis Kivi who lived in her cottage in 1864-1871. She was also a known wolfer, who was awarded a prize by the Finnish Hunting Association for her skills.

Life
Charlotta Lönnqvist was the daughter of the soldier Jonas Lönnqvist and Maria Forsström. She never married. After the death of her parents, she inherited her childhood cottage. She had a small saving capital and occasionally earned some money catering at weddings and funerals. From 1864 to 1871, Aleksis Kivi lived with her. It was regarded improper for a male to live alone with a female of the same class (in which neither was employed by the other), and this caused rumors that they were lovers. Charlotta Lönnqvist participated in charity, and her relief work during the famine of 1866-68 ruined her. Kivi therefore gave her an income from his writings in 1869.

References
 Suomen kansallisbiografia (National Biography of Finland)

Finnish women
1815 births
1891 deaths
19th-century Finnish people
Swedish-speaking Finns